The Tulsa Run is a 15 kilometer running event in Tulsa, Oklahoma featuring over 8,000 runners in the annual October event.

External links
unofficial web page

15K runs
Sports in Tulsa, Oklahoma
Road running competitions in the United States